Astyris profundi is a species of sea snail, a marine gastropod mollusc in the family Columbellidae, the dove snails.

Description
The shell size is up to 8 mm.

Distribution
This species is distributed in the Atlantic Ocean along the Azores, Cape Verde and along North Carolina, in the Gulf of Mexico and in the Caribbean Sea.

References

 Rosenberg, G., F. Moretzsohn, and E. F. García. 2009. Gastropoda (Mollusca) of the Gulf of Mexico, pp. 579–699 in Felder, D.L. and D.K. Camp (eds.), Gulf of Mexico–Origins, Waters, and Biota. Biodiversity. Texas A&M Press, College Station, Texas

External links
 

Columbellidae
Gastropods described in 1889
Molluscs of the Atlantic Ocean
Molluscs of the Azores
Gastropods of Cape Verde